Vangede is a suburb 8 km north of central Copenhagen, Denmark. This area is primarily made up of one and two family houses and two and three story apartment buildings.

History
The first known references to the village is from 1346 when it is referred to as Wangwethæ.

Landmarks
Munkegaard School was completed in 1953 to a design by Arne Jacobsen. Vangede Church is from 1974 and was designed by Johan Otto von Spreckelsen, who would later also design the Grande Arche in Paris. Vangede Battery has been converted into a park.

Transport
Vangede has three S-train-stations, Vangede, Kildebakke and dyssegård, all three of them are located on the Farum radial. Vangede is served by both the A and H trains while Dyssegård is only served by A trains. Some would consider Dyssegård being located in Dyssegård and not in Vangede.

Cultural references
The author Dan Turèll grew up in the neighbourhood and has portrayed it in his book Vangede billeder.

Notable people
 Peer Hultberg (1935 in Vangede – 2007) a Danish author and psychoanalyst
 Dan Turèll (1946 in Vangede – 1993), affectionately nicknamed "Onkel Danny" (Uncle Danny), was a popular Danish writer 
 Povl Erik Carstensen (born 1960 in Vangede) a Danish comedian, actor and jazz double bassist

References

External links

Neighbourhoods in Denmark
Copenhagen metropolitan area
Gentofte Municipality